Hussain Ali Farah Al-Hadhri, commonly known as Hussain Al-Hadhri, is an Omani  footballer who plays for Dhofar Club in Oman Professional League.

Club career

Al-Hadhri had played a vital role for Dhofar S.C.S.C. as a high scoring striker, rivaling Dhofari veteran, Hani Al-Dhabit. In 2009 Sultan Qaboos Cup final, Al Hadhri scored 2 goals of Dhofar against Saham SC. Saham won the match 7-6 on penalties after the match had ended 2-2 at normal time. He has scored a total of 38 goals for Dhofar in his two spells with the club.

After a one-year spell in Saudi Arabia with Al-Raed, he came back to Oman and on 30 August 2014, he signed a one-year contract with Dhofar S.C.S.C.

Club career statistics

International career

U-22 Career
Hussain started his career with the Oman national under-23 football team in 2010 when Oman participated in the 2010 Asian Games. He scored two goals in the tournament in a 3-0 win over Hong Kong in the Round of 16. Oman lost 1-0 to Iran in the quarter-finals.

In 2011, he helped his team to win the Under 23 Gulf Cup of Nations scoring three goals, a brace in a 3-2 win over the United Arab Emirates in the Group Stage and one in a 4-3 win over Saudi Arabia in the semi-finals.

He scored nine goals in Oman's journey in 2012 London Olympics qualification, a brace in the First Round in a 3-1 win over Tajikistan, a goal in the Second Round in a 1-0 win over China and a brace in the return leg in a 3-1 win over China, a goal in the Third Round in a 2-2 draw against Qatar, a goal in a 1-1 draw against Saudi Arabia, a goal in the Playoff Round in a 1-1 draw against Syria and another in a 2-0 win over Uzbekistan. Later, Hussain was awarded with the "Top Goal Scorer" award of the competition.  Oman nearly made its first appearance in football at the Summer Olympics after earning an inter-confederation play-off match with Senegal for a chance qualify for the 2012 Olympics but a 0-2 loss eliminated them from contention.

U-22 team career statistics

Goals for U-22 Team
Scores and results list Oman's goal tally first.

National team career
Hussain has featured for the Oman national football team since being called up for the first time in 2006 at the age of 16. He has made appearances in the 2007 AFC Asian Cup, the 2008 WAFF Championship, the 2009 Gulf Cup of Nations, the 2010 FIFA World Cup qualification, the 2010 Gulf Cup of Nations, the 2014 FIFA World Cup qualification and the 2013 Gulf Cup of Nations and has represented the national team in the 2011 AFC Asian Cup qualification and the 2015 AFC Asian Cup qualification.

National team career statistics

Goals for Senior National Team
Scores and results list Oman's goal tally first.

Honours

Club
Dhofar Club
Omani League (0): Runner-up 2007–08, 2008–09, 2009–10
Sultan Qaboos Cup (1): 2006, 2011; Runner-up 2009
Oman Professional League Cup (1): 2012-13; Runner-up 2014–15
Oman Super Cup (0): Runner-up 2012
Baniyas SC International Tournament (1): Winner 2014

Individual
2011 GCC Champions League: Top Scorer
2012 Summer Olympics Men's Asian Qualifiers: Top Scorer

References

External links
 
 
 Hussain Al-Hadhri at Goal.com
 
 
 Hussain Al-Hadhri - The Illusionist | حسين الحضري جديد أعمالي

Living people
People from Salalah
Omani footballers
Oman international footballers
Omani expatriate footballers
Association football midfielders
2007 AFC Asian Cup players
Dhofar Club players
Ajman Club players
Al-Raed FC players
Saudi Professional League players
Oman Professional League players
UAE Pro League players
Expatriate footballers in the United Arab Emirates
Omani expatriate sportspeople in the United Arab Emirates
Expatriate footballers in Saudi Arabia
Omani expatriate sportspeople in Saudi Arabia
Footballers at the 2010 Asian Games
Asian Games competitors for Oman
1990 births
Oman youth international footballers